Gwaka Airport  is an airport serving Gwaka in Sud-Ubangi Province, Democratic Republic of the Congo.

See also

Transport in the Democratic Republic of the Congo
List of airports in the Democratic Republic of the Congo

References

External links
 FallingRain - Gwaka Airport
 HERE Maps - Gwaka Airport
 OpenStreetMap - Gwaka
 OurAirports - Gwaka Airport
 

Airports in Sud-Ubangi